Chikkamagaravalli Thimme Gowda Ravi (born 18 July 1967) is an Indian politician who is the current National General Secretary of Bharatiya Janata Party and four-time legislator from Chikmagalur Constituency of Karnataka State. He was a cabinet minister in the Government of Karnataka and currently is the National General secretary of Bharatiya Janata Party. He resigned his post as the cabinet minister after being appointed the National General secretary of Bharatiya Janata Party.

Politics
Ravi is a four-time legislator from Chiikamagaluru assembly seat of Karnataka. He is known for making openly communal statements against Muslims, and has been at the forefront of Hindutva movement in coastal Karnataka.

Early political career 
Ravi was a BJP Karnataka Yuva Morcha (the party Youth Wing) President. Later, Rajnath Singh made him Special Invitee and he went on to become the State General Secretary of the party. He also represented the party in press conferences.

Elections
He unsuccessfully contested against C. R. Sageer Ahamed of Congress in 1999 Karnataka Legislative Assembly elections. He lost by 982 votes.

In the 2004 Karnataka Legislative Assembly elections, C. T. Ravi defeated C. R. Sageer Ahamed by a margin of more than 25,000 Votes in Chikmagalur, thus marking C. T. Ravi's entry to Karnataka Legislature.
Previously he was in Congress party.

When Karnataka Legislative Assembly was dissolved in 2007 and Karnataka went to polls in April–May 2008, he was again fielded by BJP from Chikmagalur Constituency and won.

In the recent concluded Karnataka Legislative Assembly elections, C. T. Ravi won from Chikmagalur Constituency with a margin of 10,000+ Votes. On 20 August 2019, he was inducted as the Cabinet Minister in the BJP Government led by B.S. Yediyurappa.

Minister For Karnataka government 

In 2012 he was named Higher Education Minister. In the post he dealt with Dakshina Kannada, Chikkamagaluru district education and other development projects and he served as the Minister of Tourism and Kannada language in the Fourth B. S. Yeddyurappa ministry and was also Minister of Sports and Youth from January 2020 and resigned on 4 October 2020.

When addressing party workers in Chikkamagalur, Ravi made derogatory statements. In Kannada, he associated those who resist or do not vote for Modi to a word that belittles women on April 14, 2019. The committee led by State Women's Congress President Dr. B. Pushpa Amarnath complained to the National Commission for Women.

Legal proceedings

2011 land scam case 
An FIR was filed against Ravi by Lokayukta police for allegedly being involved in a land scam after a complaint from a municipal councillor. The complainant claimed that Ravi got allotted three civic amenities sites in his wife's name in favour of the Anjaneya Education Society, run by his relatives by giving fake documents for ₹12.09 lakh while the market value was over ₹5 crore. However authorities claimed that there was no education society registered in the name of his wife and he got the land for a school which did not even exist.

The complainant also accused Ravi of getting two other residential sites allotted in his wife's name in Chikamagalur "using his position as an MLA, by adopting backdoor methods".

2012 Disproportionate assets case 
In 2012, a RTI activist A.C. Kumar of Chikkamagaluru filed a private lawsuit blaming Ravi of having assets disproportionally large to his documented revenue sources from 2004 to 2010. He stated that in this period, his known revenue sources were ₹ 49 lakh, while his assets were ₹ 3.18 crore. In 2015, the Supreme Court gave guidelines regulating petitioners to file affidavits in support of their allegations or complaints, Ravi asked the high court to dismiss the whole prosecution on the basis that the petitioner did not file an affidavit. In order to give the petitioner, AC Kumar, a chance to file an affidavit in support of his accusations made against Ravi, the high court sent the case back to the special court.

Controversies 
About 30 lecturers staged protest against Ravi in a resort in Yalahanka where Ravi was staying  in August 2015 claiming that he had cheated them of their money. The protestors claimed that Ravi who was higher education minister collected money from them promising permanent jobs in aided diploma colleges. They claimed that they had lost both their money and jobs and demanded a refund. They also raised slogans against Ravi. The BJP leaders quickly jolted the protesters inside the resort when they saw media persons approaching.

Hate Speeches
C T Ravi received a notice from the Election Commission for his 'inflammatory' speech at the Sakleshpur election rally in Hassan district on 6 April 2009.

The Karnataka High Court in March 2018 ordered issuance of notices to Union minister Anant Kumar Hegde and MLA C.T. Ravi alleging that the two BJP leaders made provocative speeches inciting communal violence during November 2017.

Car wreck incident 
Two youngsters were killed and three others were injured when an SUV car in which C.T. Ravi was travelling crashed into two cars parked by the side of the road on Tumakuru district on February 19, 2019. One of the drivers of the cars that were hit claimed that Ravi threatened him. The locals blamed Ravi for the wreck, claiming that he was driving the car himself at a very high speed. Though reports also stated that Ravi was driving the car while drunk, Karnataka BJP's state unit claimed that Ravi was not driving the car. The police booked Ravi's driver on charges of rash and negligent driving. Many locals accused Ravi of not respecting the sentiments of families of the deceased. Relatives and friends of the dead staged a protest against Ravi on the hospital premises demanding justice.

Politicial positions

Halal food
Members of the right-wing Hindutva groups in India have protested against the sale of Halal food in India. Bajrang Dal, Vishwa Hindu Parishad and other Hindutva groups were running door to door campaign in Karnataka, asking people not to purchase Halal meat. In March 2022 the Hindutva group Bajrang Dal physically attacked a Muslim meat seller, five persons were arrested in the incident. In March 2022, the Hindutva ruling party, BJP national general secretary C. T. Ravi had called halal food as "economic jihad".

References

External links 
 The Times Of India
 Times Of India

Living people
1967 births
Bharatiya Janata Party politicians from Karnataka
People from Chikkamagaluru
Karnataka MLAs 2008–2013
Karnataka MLAs 2013–2018
Karnataka MLAs 2018–2023